The 1986 Andalusian regional election was held on Sunday, 22 June 1986, to elect the 2nd Parliament of the autonomous community of Andalusia. All 109 seats in the Parliament were up for election. The election was held simultaneously with the 1986 Spanish general election.

The former president of the Regional Government of Andalusia Rafael Escuredo had been replaced in the post by José Rodríguez de la Borbolla in March 1984. Escuredo's resignation had been forced by his party, the Spanish Socialist Workers' Party (PSOE–A), allegedly over a scandal involving a chalet owned by Escuredo that was claimed to have been built with preferential treatment by Dragados; in reality, Escuredo's demise was a result of tensions with the central government of Felipe González over transfer of regional powers, his agrarian reform proposal and a perception that Escuredo's style was growing increasingly nationalist.

The election saw Rodríguez de la Borbolla's PSOE–A renew its mandate, albeit with a slightly reduced majority. The dissolution and subsequent disappearance of the Union of the Democratic Centre (UCD) paved the way for the right-wing People's Coalition—the electoral alliance of the People's Alliance (AP), the People's Democratic Party (PDP) and the Liberal Party (PL)—to amalgamate around itself most of the centre-right vote in Andalusia, but at 22.2% and 28 seats this still placed it well below the PSOE–A's score. In contrast, the left-wing United Left–Assembly for Andalusia (IU–CA), the Communist Party of Spain (PCE)-led coalition formed in Spain in the aftermath of the NATO membership referendum held on 12 March, achieved a major electoral breakthrough under the candidacy of former Córdoba mayor Julio Anguita, scoring almost 18% of the share, 19 seats and coming within a three-point margin of becoming the most voted political party in the Córdoba constituency.

Overview

Electoral system
The Parliament of Andalusia was the devolved, unicameral legislature of the autonomous community of Andalusia, having legislative power in regional matters as defined by the Spanish Constitution of 1978 and the regional Statute of Autonomy, as well as the ability to vote confidence in or withdraw it from a regional president.

Voting for the Parliament was on the basis of universal suffrage, which comprised all nationals over 18 years of age, registered in Andalusia and in full enjoyment of their political rights. The 109 members of the Parliament of Andalusia were elected using the D'Hondt method and a closed list proportional representation, with an electoral threshold of three percent of valid votes—which included blank ballots—being applied in each constituency. Seats were allocated to constituencies, corresponding to the provinces of Almería, Cádiz, Córdoba, Granada, Huelva, Jaén, Málaga and Seville, with each being allocated an initial minimum of eight seats and the remaining 45 being distributed in proportion to their populations (provided that the number of seats in each province did not exceed two times that of any other).

The use of the D'Hondt method might result in a higher effective threshold, depending on the district magnitude.

Election date
The term of the Parliament of Andalusia expired four years after the date of its previous election. Election day was to take place between the thirtieth and the sixtieth day from the date of expiry of parliament. The previous election was held on 23 May 1982, which meant that the legislature's term would have expired on 23 May 1986. The election was required to take place no later than the sixtieth day from the date of expiry of parliament, setting the latest possible election date for the Parliament on Tuesday, 22 July 1986.

The Parliament of Andalusia could not be dissolved before the date of expiry of parliament. In the event of an investiture process failing to elect a regional president within a two-month period from the first ballot, the candidate from the party with the highest number of seats was to be deemed automatically elected.

Parliamentary composition
The Parliament of Andalusia was officially dissolved on 29 April 1986, after the publication of the dissolution decree in the Official Gazette of the Regional Government of Andalusia. The table below shows the composition of the parliamentary groups in the Parliament at the time of dissolution.

Parties and candidates
The electoral law allowed for parties and federations registered in the interior ministry, coalitions and groupings of electors to present lists of candidates. Parties and federations intending to form a coalition ahead of an election were required to inform the relevant Electoral Commission within ten days of the election call, whereas groupings of electors needed to secure the signature of at least one percent of the electorate in the constituencies for which they sought election, disallowing electors from signing for more than one list of candidates.

Below is a list of the main parties and electoral alliances which contested the election:

Opinion polls
The table below lists voting intention estimates in reverse chronological order, showing the most recent first and using the dates when the survey fieldwork was done, as opposed to the date of publication. Where the fieldwork dates are unknown, the date of publication is given instead. The highest percentage figure in each polling survey is displayed with its background shaded in the leading party's colour. If a tie ensues, this is applied to the figures with the highest percentages. The "Lead" column on the right shows the percentage-point difference between the parties with the highest percentages in a poll. When available, seat projections determined by the polling organisations are displayed below (or in place of) the percentages in a smaller font; 55 seats were required for an absolute majority in the Parliament of Andalusia.

Results

Overall

Distribution by constituency

Aftermath

Notes

References
Opinion poll sources

Other

1986 in Andalusia
Andalusia
Regional elections in Andalusia
June 1986 events in Europe